George Dewhurst (1889 in Preston, Lancashire, England - 8 November 1968 in Tooting, London, England) was a British actor, screenwriter and film director. He directed several film versions of the play A Sister to Assist 'Er.

Partial filmography

Screenwriter
 The Lunatic at Large (1921)
 The Narrow Valley (1921)
 Dollars in Surrey (1921)
 No Lady (1931)
 The Price of Wisdom (1935)
 Adventure Ltd. (1935)
 King of the Castle (1936)

Director
 The Live Wire (1917)
 A Great Coup (1919)
The Homemaker (1919)
 The Uninvited Guest (1923)
 The Little Door Into the World (1923)
 What the Butler Saw (1924)
 Sweeney Todd (1926)
 Irish Destiny (1926)
 The Rising Generation (1928)

Actor
 The Woman Wins (1918)
 The Toilers (1919)
 The Tinted Venus (1921)
 Never Trouble Trouble (1931)
 Men Without Honour (1939)
 Deadlock (1943)

References

External links

1889 births
1968 deaths
English male film actors
English male silent film actors
British film directors
British male screenwriters
Actors from Preston, Lancashire
20th-century English male actors
20th-century British screenwriters
Mass media people from Preston, Lancashire